Henry Harris Moll (19 March 1921 – 16 May 2003) was a South African judge who served as Judge President of the Transvaal Provincial Division of the Supreme Court of South Africa from 1985 until 1991.

See also
List of Judges President of the Gauteng Division of the High Court of South Africa

References

1921 births
2003 deaths
South African judges